Homecoming (2021) may refer to:

 Impact Wrestling Homecoming (2021), a professional wrestling event held by Impact Wrestling
 AEW Homecoming (2021), a professional wrestling event held by All Elite Wrestling (AEW)